Anti-pain may refer to:

 A colloquial term for analgesia
 Antipain, a peptide used in biochemical research